Molodyozhnaya is a Moscow Metro station in the Kuntsevo District, Western Administrative Okrug, Moscow. Molodyozhnaya was opened in 1965 as a part of the Filyovskaya Line. On 7 January 2008 the station was detached from the line on which it had been for 42 years.

Building
The station was designed by architect Rimidalv Pogrebnoy. It has the standard pillar-trispan design. The pillars are white marble with bands of pink marble at the top and bottom. The walls are tiled.

Moscow Metro stations
Railway stations in Russia opened in 1965
Arbatsko-Pokrovskaya Line
Railway stations located underground in Russia